Charoen Khanthawong (21 April 1933 – 4 May 2022) was a Thai politician. A member of the Democrat Party, he served in the House of Representatives from 1975 to 2014. He died on 4 May 2022 at the age of 89.

References

1933 births
2022 deaths
Charoen Khanthawong
Charoen Khanthawong
Charoen Khanthawong
Science ministers
Charoen Khanthawong
Charoen Khanthawong
Charoen Khanthawong
Charoen Khanthawong
Charoen Khanthawong